River Quest is a river rapids ride in German theme park Phantasialand. The ride was built in 2002 by Hafema and notably has two lifts near the start of the ride to take the boats to their highest point. The ride previously held the record for the largest drop on a rafting ride. This record was taken in 2018 by Infinity Falls at SeaWorld Orlando.

Theming 
River Quest was built next to Mystery Castle to extend the area of Mystery. The two rides were the only ones in Mystery until Klugheim opened with Taron and Raik in 2016. This led to River Quest being slightly rethemed in 2017 to fit in with the Klugheim theme.

Attraction 
Construction of River Quest was made possible by a fire that devastated part of the park on 1 May 2001, which destroyed two rides (Grand Canyon Bahn and Gebirgsbahn) and left space requiring redevelopment. Even so, the space available was relatively small for a river rapids ride so, to save space, two elevators are used to take boats to their highest point rather than the more traditional lift hill.

References